Zarah Razafimahatratra (born 24 August 1994) is a retired Malagasy tennis player.

Razafimahatratra was Madagascar's top female tennis player. She won one singles title and five doubles titles on the ITF Women's Circuit.

In 2013, she made her debut for the Madagascar Fed Cup team. She had her maiden appearance against Cyprus in Moldova on 9 May, helping the team to a win following a decade of absence.

On the junior circuit, she achieved her career-high ranking of world number 22 on 29 January 2012.

Career

2012
Razafimahatratra began her 2012 season with back-to-back Grade-1 junior tournaments in South America, losing in the first round of both, the first being in Costa Rica and the second in Venezuela. In March, she headed to South Africa to play three consecutive Grade-2 tournaments in Potchefstroom. She reached the quarterfinals of all three tournaments. After this, Razafimahatratra travelled to Europe for the big junior clay court season, playing four tournaments, both Grade-1 and Grade- A, with her best result being a quarterfinal. She then lost in the second round of three consecutive junior tournaments.

As it turned out, these would be the last junior tournaments Razafimahatratra would play. In October, she began focusing on her professional career, and played a 25k tournament in Lagos, Nigeria, under a wild-card entry. In the first round, she defeated Kyra Shroff before another win over Viktoriya Tomova in the second round. In the quarterfinals, however, she met the top seed from Russia, Nina Bratchikova, and despite taking the first set, the eighteen-year-old was eventually defeated. In doubles, she reached the quarterfinals alongside Valeria Patiuk. The following week, Razafimahatratra played another 25k event in Lagos, but was forced to qualify. She did so, and after defeating Maria Sakkari in the first round lost to Lu Jiajing in the second. She reached the quarterfinal of the doubles tournament with Patiuk.

Zarah's final tournaments of the year were back-to-back 10k events in Potchefstroom, South Africa. She reached the semifinals of the first tournament before being blasted out by Chanel Simmonds, winning not a single game. In doubles, however, she reached the final alongside Lynn Kiro; they lost against Kim Grajdek and Keren Shlomo. In the second tournament in Potchefstroom, Zarah was crowned singles and doubles champion.

2013
Razafimahatratra's 2013 campaign began with four consecutive 10k tournaments in Sharm El Sheikh. In the first event, she lost a three-set match against eventual champion Adrijana Lekaj, but went on to win the doubles with Romanian Ilka Csöregi. The following week, she lost in the second round to the second seed, but once more lifted the doubles trophy with Csöregi. In the third tournament, however, she fared better in singles, reaching the semifinals without dropping a set, before being defeated by Darya Lebesheva.

ITF finals

Singles (1–2)

Doubles (5–2)

ITF junior finals

Singles (7–6)

Doubles (10–4)

References

External links
 
 
 
 

1994 births
Living people
Malagasy female tennis players
Tennis players at the 2010 Summer Youth Olympics
People from Antananarivo
African Games silver medalists for Madagascar
African Games medalists in tennis
Competitors at the 2015 African Games